The full stop (Commonwealth English), period (North American English), or full point , is a punctuation mark. It is used for several purposes, most often to mark the end of a declarative sentence (as distinguished from a question or exclamation). This sentence-ending use, alone, defines the strictest sense of full stop. Although full stop technically applies only when the mark is used to end a sentence, the distinction – drawn since at least 1897 – is not maintained by all modern style guides and dictionaries.

The mark is also used, singly, to indicate omitted characters or, in a series, as an ellipsis, to indicate omitted words. It may be placed after an initial letter used to abbreviate a word. It is often placed after each individual letter in acronyms and initialisms (e.g. "U.S.A."). However, the use of full stops after letters in an initialism or acronym is declining, and many of these without punctuation have become accepted norms (e.g., "UK" and "NATO"). This trend has progressed somewhat more slowly in the English dialect of the United States than in other English language dialects.

A full stop is frequently used at the end of word abbreviations – in British usage, primarily truncations like Rev., but not after contractions like Revd (in American English it is used in both cases).

In the English-speaking world, a punctuation mark identical to the full stop is used as the decimal separator and for other purposes, and may be called a point. In computing, it is called a dot. It is sometimes called a baseline dot to distinguish it from the interpunct (or middle dot).

History

Ancient Greek origin 

The full stop symbol derives from the Greek punctuation introduced by Aristophanes of Byzantium in the 3rd century . In his system, there were a series of dots whose placement determined their meaning.

stigmḕ teleía, stigmḕ mésē and hypostigmḕ 
The full stop at the end of a completed thought or expression was marked by a high dot ⟨˙⟩, called the stigmḕ teleía or "terminal dot". The "middle dot" ⟨·⟩, the stigmḕ mésē, marked a division in a thought occasioning a longer breath (essentially a semicolon), while the low dot ⟨.⟩, called the hypostigmḕ or "underdot", marked a division in a thought occasioning a shorter breath (essentially a comma).

Medieval simplification 
In practice, scribes mostly employed the terminal dot; the others fell out of use and were later replaced by other symbols. From the 9th century onwards, the full stop began appearing as a low mark (instead of a high one), and by the time printing began in Western Europe, the lower dot was regular and then universal.

Medieval Latin and modern English period 
The name period is first attested (as the Latin loanword ) in Ælfric of Eynsham's Old English treatment on grammar. There, it is distinguished from the full stop (the ), and continues the Greek underdot's earlier function as a comma between phrases. It shifted its meaning, to a dot marking a full stop, in the works of the 16th-century grammarians. In 19th-century texts, both British English and American English were consistent in their usage of the terms period and full stop.  The word period was used as a name for what printers often called the "full point", the punctuation mark that was a dot on the baseline and used in several situations. The phrase full stop was only used to refer to the punctuation mark when it was used to terminate a sentence.  This terminological distinction seems to be eroding.  For example, the 1998 edition of Fowler's Modern English Usage used full point for the mark used after an abbreviation, but full stop or full point when it was employed at the end of a sentence; the 2015 edition, however, treats them as synonymous (and prefers full stop), and New Hart's Rules does likewise (but prefers full point).  In 1989, the last edition (1989) of the original Hart's Rules (before it became The Oxford Guide to Style in 2002) exclusively used full point.

Usage 
Full stops are the most commonly used punctuation marks; analysis of texts indicate that approximately half of all punctuation marks used are full stops.

Ending sentences 
Full stops indicate the end of sentences that are not questions or exclamations.

After initials 
It is usual in North American English to use full stops after initials; e.g. A. A. Milne, George W. Bush. British usage is less strict. A few style guides discourage full stops after initials. However, there is a general trend and initiatives to spell out names in full instead of abbreviating them in order to avoid ambiguity.

Abbreviations 
A full stop is used after some abbreviations. If the abbreviation ends a declaratory sentence there is no additional period immediately following the full stop that ends the abbreviation (e.g. "My name is Gabriel Gama, Jr."). Though two full stops (one for the abbreviation, one for the sentence ending) might be expected, conventionally only one is written. This is an intentional omission, and thus not haplography, which is unintentional omission of a duplicate. In the case of an interrogative or exclamatory sentence ending with an abbreviation, a question or exclamation mark can still be added (e.g. "Are you Gabriel Gama Jr.?").

Abbreviations and personal titles of address 

According to the Oxford A–Z of Grammar and Punctuation, "If the abbreviation includes both the first and last letter of the abbreviated word, as in 'Mister' ['Mr'] and 'Doctor' ['Dr'], a full stop is not used." This does not include, for example, the standard abbreviations for titles such as Professor ("Prof.") or Reverend ("Rev."), because they do not end with the last letter of the word they are abbreviating.

In American English, the common convention is to include the period after all such abbreviations.

Acronyms and initialisms 
In acronyms and initialisms, the modern style is generally to not use full points after each initial (e.g.: DNA, UK, USSR). The punctuation is somewhat more often used in American English, most commonly with U.S. and U.S.A. in particular.  However, this depends much upon the house style of a particular writer or publisher. As some examples from American style guides, The Chicago Manual of Style (primarily for book and academic-journal publishing) deprecates the use of full points in acronyms, including U.S., while The Associated Press Stylebook (primarily for journalism) dispenses with full points in acronyms except for certain two-letter cases, including U.S., U.K., and U.N., but not EU.

Mathematics 

The period glyph is used in the presentation of numbers, but in only one of two alternate styles at a time.

In the more prevalent usage in English-speaking countries, the point represents a decimal separator, visually dividing whole numbers from fractional (decimal) parts. The comma is then used to separate the whole-number parts into groups of three digits each, when numbers are sufficiently large.

 1.007         (one and seven thousandths)
 1,002.007     (one thousand two and seven thousandths)
 1,002,003.007 (one million two thousand three and seven thousandths)

The more prevalent usage in much of Europe, southern Africa, and Latin America (with the exception of Mexico due to the influence of the United States), reverses the roles of the comma and point, but sometimes substitutes a (thin-)space for a point.

 1,007                          (one and seven thousandths)
 1.002,007 or 1 002,007         (one thousand two and seven thousandths)
 1.002.003,007 or 1 002 003,007 (one million two thousand three and seven thousandths)

(To avoid problems with spaces, another convention sometimes used is to use apostrophe signs (') instead of spaces.)

India, Bangladesh, Nepal, and Pakistan follow the Indian numbering system, which utilizes commas and decimals much like the aforementioned system popular in most English-speaking countries, but separates values of one hundred thousand and above differently, into divisions of lakh and crore:

1.007         (one and seven thousandths)
1,002.007     (one thousand two and seven thousandths) 
10,02,003.007 (one million two thousand three and seven thousandths or ten lakh two thousand three and seven thousandths)

In countries that use the comma as a decimal separator, the point is sometimes found as a multiplication sign; for example, 5,2 . 2 = 10,4; this usage is impractical in cases where the point is used as a decimal separator, hence the use of the interpunct: 5.2 · 2 = 10.4. This notation is also seen when multiplying units in science; for example, 50 km/h could be written as 50 km·h−1. However, the point is used in all countries to indicate a dot product, i.e. the scalar product of two vectors.

Logic 
In older literature on mathematical logic, the period glyph used to indicate how expressions should be bracketed (see Glossary of Principia Mathematica).

Computing 
In computing, the full point, usually called a dot in this context, is often used as a delimiter, such as in DNS lookups, Web addresses, file names and software release versions:

 www.wikipedia.org
 document.txt
 192.168.0.1
 Chrome 92.0.4515.130 

It is used in many programming languages as an important part of the syntax. C uses it as a means of accessing a member of a struct, and this syntax was inherited by C++ as a means of accessing a member of a class or object. Java and Python also follow this convention. Pascal uses it both as a means of accessing a member of a record set (the equivalent of struct in C), a member of an object, and after the end construct that defines the body of the program. In APL it is also used for generalised inner product and outer product. In Erlang, Prolog, and Smalltalk, it marks the end of a statement ("sentence").  In a regular expression, it represents a match of any character. In Perl and PHP, the dot is the string concatenation operator. In the Haskell standard library, it is the function composition operator. In COBOL a full stop ends a statement.

In file systems, the dot is commonly used to separate the extension of a file name from the name of the file. RISC OS uses dots to separate levels of the hierarchical file system when writing path names—similar to / (forward-slash) in Unix-based systems and \ (back-slash) in MS-DOS-based systems and the Windows NT systems that succeeded them.

In Unix-like operating systems, some applications treat files or directories that start with a dot as hidden. This means that they are not displayed or listed to the user by default.

In Unix-like systems and Microsoft Windows, the dot character represents the working directory of the file system. Two dots (..) represent the parent directory of the working directory.

Bourne shell-derived command-line interpreters, such as sh, ksh, and bash, use the dot as a command to read a file and execute its content in the running interpreter. (Some of these also offer source as a synonym, based on that usage in the C-shell.)

Versions of software are often denoted with the style x.y.z (or more), where x is a major release, y is a mid-cycle enhancement release and z is a patch level designation, but actual usage is entirely vendor specific.

Telegraphy 
The term STOP was used in telegrams in place of the full stop. The end of a sentence would be marked by STOP; its use "in telegraphic communications was greatly increased during the World War, when the Government employed it widely as a precaution against having messages garbled or misunderstood, as a result of the misplacement or emission  of the tiny dot or period."

In conversation 
In British English, the words "full stop" at the end of an utterance strengthen it; they indicate that it admits of no discussion: "I'm not going with you, full stop." In American English the word "period" serves this function.

Another common use in African-American Vernacular English is found in the phrase "And that's on period" which is used to express the strength of the speaker's previous statement, usually to emphasise an opinion.

Linguistics 
The International Phonetic Alphabet uses the full stop to signify a syllable break.

Time 
In British English, whether for the 12-hour clock or sometimes its 24-hour counterpart, the dot is commonly used and some style guides recommend it when telling time, including those from non-BBC public broadcasters in the UK, the academic manual published by Oxford University Press under various titles, as well as the internal house style book for the University of Oxford, and that of The Economist, The Guardian and The Times newspapers.  American and Canadian English mostly prefers and uses colons (i.e., 11:15 PM/pm/p.m. or 23:15 for AmE/CanE and 11.15 pm or 23.15 for BrE), so does the BBC, but only with 24-hour times, according to its news style guide as updated in August 2020. The point as a time separator is also used in Irish English, particularly by the Raidió Teilifís Éireann (RTÉ), and to a lesser extent in Australian, Cypriot, Maltese, New Zealand, South African and other Commonwealth English varieties outside Canada.

Punctuation styles when quoting 

The practice in the United States and Canada is to place full stops and commas inside quotation marks in most styles. In the British system, which is also called "logical quotation", full stops and commas are placed according to grammatical sense: This means that when they are part of the quoted material, they should be placed inside, and otherwise should be outside. For example, they are placed outside in the cases of words-as-words, titles of short-form works, and quoted sentence fragments.
 Bruce Springsteen, nicknamed "the Boss," performed "American Skin." (closed or American style)
 Bruce Springsteen, nicknamed "the Boss", performed "American Skin". (logical or British style)
 He said, "I love music." (both)

There is some national crossover.  American style is common in British fiction writing. British style is sometimes used in American English. For example, the Chicago Manual of Style recommends it for fields where comma placement could affect the meaning of the quoted material, such as linguistics and textual criticism.

Use of placement according to logical or grammatical sense, or "logical convention", now the more common practice in regions other than North America, was advocated in the influential book The King's English by Fowler and Fowler, published in 1906. Prior to the influence of this work, the typesetter's or printer's style, or "closed convention", now also called American style, was common throughout the world.

Spacing after a full stop 

There have been a number of practices relating to the spacing after a full stop. Some examples are listed below:
 One word space ("French spacing"). This is the current convention in most countries that use the ISO basic Latin alphabet for published and final written work, as well as digital media.
 Two word spaces ("English spacing").  It is sometimes claimed that the two-space convention stems from the use of the monospaced font on typewriters, but in fact that convention replicates much earlier typography — the intent was to provide a clear break between sentences.  This spacing method was gradually replaced by the single space convention in published print, where space is at a premium, and continues in much digital media.
 One widened space (such as an em space). This spacing was seen in historical typesetting practices (until the early 20th century). It has also been used in other typesetting systems such as the Linotype machine and the TeX system. Modern computer-based digital fonts can adjust the spacing after terminal punctuation as well, creating a space slightly wider than a standard word space.

Full stops in other scripts

Greek 

Although the present Greek full stop (teleía) is romanized as a Latin full stop and encoded identically with the full stop in Unicode, the historic full stop in Greek was a high dot and the low dot functioned as a kind of comma, as noted above. The low dot was increasingly but irregularly used to mark full stops after the 9th century and was fully adapted after the advent of print. The teleia should also be distinguished from the ano teleia mark, which is named "high stop" but looks like an interpunct (a middle dot) and principally functions as the Greek semicolon.

Armenian 
The Armenian script uses the ։. It looks similar to the colon.

Chinese and Japanese 
In Simplified Chinese and Japanese, a small circle is used instead of a solid dot: "。︀" (U+3002 "Ideographic Full Stop"). Traditional Chinese uses the same symbol centered in the line rather than aligned to the baseline.

Korean 
Korean uses the Latin full stop along with its native script.

Brahmic scripts

Nagari 
Indo-Aryan languages predominantly use Nagari-based scripts. In the Devanagari script used to write languages like Hindi, Maithili, Nepali, etc., a vertical line  (U+0964 "Devanagari Danda") is used to mark the end of a sentence. In Sanskrit, an additional symbol  (U+0965 "Devanagari Double Danda") is used to mark the end of a poetic verse. However, some languages that are written in Devanagari use the Latin full stop, such as Marathi.

Also, languages like Odia and Panjabi (which respectively use Oriya and Gurmukhi scripts) use the same symbol.

Inspired from Indic scripts, the Santali language also uses a similar symbol in Ol Chiki script:  (U+1C7E "Ol Chiki Punctuation Mucaad") to mark the end of sentence. Similarly, it also uses  (U+1C7F "Ol Chiki Punctuation Double Mucaad") to indicate a major break, like end of section, although rarely used.

Sinhalese 
In Sinhala, a symbol called kundaliya: "෴" (U+0DF4 "Sinhala Punctuation Kunddaliya") was used before the colonial era. Periods were later introduced into Sinhalese script after the introduction of paper due to the influence of European languages.

Southeast Asian 
In Burmese script, the symbol  (U+104B "Myanmar Sign Section") is used as full stop.

However, in Thai, no symbol corresponding to the full stop is used as terminal punctuation. A sentence is written without spaces and a space is typically used to mark the end of a clause or sentence.

Tibetic 

The Tibetan script uses two different full-stops: tshig-grub  (U+0F0D "Tibetan Mark Shad") marks end of a section of text; don-tshan  (U+0F0E "Tibetan Mark Nyis Shad") marks end of a whole topic.

Shahmukhi 
For Indo-Aryan languages which are written in Nastaliq, like Kashmiri, Panjabi, Saraiki and Urdu, a symbol called  is used as a full stop at the end of sentences and in abbreviations. It looks similar to a lowered dash.

Ge'ez 
In the Ge'ez script used to write Amharic and several other Ethiopian and Eritrean languages, the equivalent of the full stop following a sentence is the  "።"—which means four dots. The two dots on the right are slightly ascending from the two on the left, with space in between.

Encodings 

There is also , used in several shorthand (stenography) systems.

This form is used alongside CJK characters.

In text messages 
Researchers from Binghamton University performed a small study, published in 2016, on young adults and found that text messages that included sentences ended with full stops—as opposed to those with no terminal punctuation—were perceived as insincere, though they stipulated that their results apply only to this particular medium of communication: "Our sense was, is that because [text messages] were informal and had a chatty kind of feeling to them, that a period may have seemed stuffy, too formal, in that context," said head researcher Cecelia Klin. The study did not find handwritten notes to be affected.

A 2016 story by Jeff Guo in The Washington Post, stated that the line break had become the default method of punctuation in texting, comparable to the use of line breaks in poetry, and that a period at the end of a sentence causes the tone of the message to be perceived as cold, angry or passive-aggressive.

According to Gretchen McCulloch, an internet linguist, using a full stop to end messages is seen as "rude" by more and more people. She said this can be attributed to the way we text and use instant messaging apps like WhatsApp and Facebook Messenger. She added that the default way to break up one's thoughts is to send each thought as an individual message.

See also

References 

Punctuation
Ancient Greek punctuation